Ariosoma nigrimanum is an eel in the family Congridae (conger/garden eels). It was described by John Roxborough Norman in 1939. It is a tropical, marine eel which is known from the Gulf of Aden, in the western Indian Ocean. It is known to dwell at a maximum depth of 220 metres. Males can reach a maximum total length of 33.5 centimetres.

References

nigrimanum
Taxa named by John Roxborough Norman
Fish described in 1939